World Athletics Label Road Races are races that the World Athletics (until 2019: IAAF) designates as one of the "leading road races around the world." The classification was first introduced for the 2008 running season, upon the suggestion of the IAAF Road Running Commission. The races are split into three categories: marathons, half marathons and other. Within the "other" category are traditional road race distances, over which World Athletics world records can be set, along with some "Classical races", which span unusual distances. The Labels are considered a prestigious award by race organisers, and include the six World Marathon Majors.

In the first year, only Gold and Silver Labels were awarded, and 49 races were recognised. A third tier was introduced in 2010, entitled the Bronze Label, and in 2015, 88 races were listed in total.

In October 2018, the IAAF announced to introduced the Platinum Label for the 2020 season. For the 2021, the Platinum Label was renamed Elite Platinum Label, the Gold Label was renamed Elite Label, and the Silver and Bronze Labels were merged into Label Races.

The Labels are assessed and awarded each year. Race organisers have to apply to the World Athletics for recognition, and show that their race can meet a number of criteria. The criteria vary for the different levels; Gold Labels have the strictest requirements, followed by Silver, then Bronze. All three categories require what the World Athletics describes as an international elite field, that requires at least five nations (four for Bronze) to be represented by runners with times faster than the World Athletics's guidelines. Additionally, the race course must be closed to vehicular traffic, and measured to the Association of International Marathons and Distance Races (AIMS) standard, with full electronic timing used to generate the results. The race must be organised in a way that minimizes ecological damage to the surrounding areas. A specified number of doping tests must be carried out, and prize money for the participants should be equal, irrespective of gender or nationality, though additional rewards can be given to runners from the host nation.

In 2017, Japan had the most road race Label events, with 9, although the Czech Republic hosted the most Gold Label events, 7. 3 races on the African continent received Label status in 2015.

Editions

See also
List of half marathon races
List of World Athletics Label marathon races

References

External links
 World Athletics Label Road Race at World Athletics web site

 
Road Race Label Events
Long-distance running competitions
Road running competitions
Annual athletics series